Lafayette Roller Derby is a women's flat track roller derby league based in Lafayette, Indiana. Founded in 2008, the league consists of a single team which competes against teams from other leagues. Lafayette is a member of the Women's Flat Track Derby Association (WFTDA).

History
The league was accepted into the Women's Flat Track Derby Association Apprentice Program in July 2010. Lafayette became a full WFTDA member in December 2013.

By early 2012, the league had 31 skaters, of whom 14 were mothers, and its bouts were attracting hundreds of spectators.  The growth in league membership permitted the creation of separate A and B teams.

WFTDA rankings

References

Lafayette, Indiana
Roller derby leagues established in 2008
Roller derby leagues in Indiana
Women's Flat Track Derby Association Division 3
2008 establishments in Indiana